Pseudoboa neuwiedii, commonly known as the ratonel or ratonera (mouse-eater), is a species of snake in the family Colubridae. The species is endemic to northern South America.

Geographic range
Pseudoboa neuwiedii is found on the mainland of South America from Colombia to The Guianas, and in Brazil along the Amazon River, as well as in Grenada, and Trinidad and Tobago.

Etymology
The specific name, neuwiedii, is in honor of German naturalist Prince Maximilian of Wied-Neuwied.

Description

Dorsally, it is reddish brown, either uniform or with some scattered small black spots. The top of the head and neck are black or dark brown. There may or may not be a yellowish crossband or collar across the temples and occiput. Ventrally, it is yellowish. This snake is venomous, but due the anatomy of its teeth it has difficulty in inoculating venom,  its venom is highly proteolytic and could affect the coagulation by degrading the fibrinogen.

Behavior
Pseudoboa neuwiedii is a powerful constrictor.

Diet
Pseudoboa neuwiedii feeds on any animal it can capture and subdue.  Individuals have been reported to consume snakes as large as or larger than they themselves are.

Reproduction
P. neuwiedii is oviparous.

References

Further reading
Duméril A-M-C, Bibron G, Duméril A[-H-A] (1854). Erpétology générale ou histoire naturelle complète des reptiles. Tome septième. Deuxième partie. [= General Herpetology or Complete Natural History of Reptiles. Volume Seven. Part Two]. Paris: Roret. pp. xi + 781-1536. (Scytale neuwiedii, new species, pp. 1001-1002). (in French).

External links
Image at ADW

Colubrids
Snakes of South America
Reptiles of Brazil
Reptiles of Colombia
Reptiles of French Guiana
Fauna of Grenada
Reptiles of Guyana
Reptiles of Panama
Reptiles of Peru
Reptiles of Suriname
Reptiles of Trinidad and Tobago
Reptiles of Venezuela
Reptiles described in 1854
Taxa named by André Marie Constant Duméril
Taxa named by Gabriel Bibron
Taxa named by Auguste Duméril